Dufferin Islands are a group of scenic man-made islands located in Niagara Falls, Ontario, approximately 1/2 mile south of the Horseshoe Falls.  The islands are known for their quiet seclusion and nature trails.

History

Early history
While Niagara Falls, New York became more well known for industry development along the lower river's edge in the 1870s, the industrial revolution started much earlier on the Canadian side.  In 1794, permission was granted to erect a saw and grist mill at the eastern end of the islands.  This was followed by an iron ore mill constructed in 1796.  Ownership of the properties was transferred to area pioneers Samuel Street and Thomas Clark by 1801, with the islands named Clark Hill Islands in 1805.  The mills were burned by American forces on July 26, 1814, following the Battle of Lundy's Lane during the War of 1812.

Thomas Clark "T.C." Street took ownership of Clark Hill Islands in 1854, renaming them Cynthia Islands.  They became accessible to the public in 1877, when Sutherland Macklem, Street's heir, built a pair of suspension bridges to carry foot & carriage traffic across.

Pedestrian traffic had already been flocking to the surrounding grounds since the mid-1820s to visit The Burning Spring, billed as Niagara Falls' "first tourist attraction".  It continued in operation for nearly sixty years, until the Niagara Parks Commission took over the property and Cynthia Islands as well, in 1887.

Early 1900s: The Islands evolve
When the Parks Commission took over, they renamed the islands in honor of Canadian Governor-General Lord Dufferin, who had been instrumental in establishing parkland along the river to replace "The Front", a notoriously rowdy tourist area.  The islands remained untouched until 1902, when the Ontario Power Company began construction on their lower river power facility, which required river water to be drawn from a point just east of the islands.

The water diversion reduced the flow through the islands to an extent that the power company, through an earlier agreement with the Parks Commission, created a series of man-made islands and cascades to compensate.  Initial work was completed by 1905, but the Parks Commission rejected the resulting layout, saying the arrangement was too formal and "out of place with the surroundings."  Beginning in 1918, surplus dirt & stone were placed strategically around the islands, giving them a more natural look.

Public Usage
Except for the years of World War II when the islands were barricaded, the public has enjoyed free access.  For many years, bathing and swimming areas were located here, first established in 1907 and moving to a site further west by 1962.  This area remained in use until the early 2000s, when it was removed due to safety concerns brought on by swimmers diving from surrounding bridges into the shallow water, as well as maintenance issues.

The north end of the islands also featured a statue depicting Thurman the dog, and paddleboats, a service began in 1973 by the Niagara Parks Commission.  The paddleboats were removed in the early 1990s, presumably out of safety as well.

Gallery

References

External links
Images of Dufferin Islands Niagara Falls Public Library (Ont.)

Landforms of the Regional Municipality of Niagara
Islands of the Niagara River
Tourist attractions in Niagara Falls, Ontario
Protected areas of the Regional Municipality of Niagara
River islands of Ontario
Niagara Parks Commission